"My Heart Leaps Up", also known as "The Rainbow", is a poem by the British Romantic poet William Wordsworth. Noted for its simple structure and language, it describes joy felt at viewing a rainbow.

Writing the poem
Wordsworth wrote "My Heart Leaps Up" on the night of March 26, 1802. Earlier that day, he had written "To The Cuckoo". He was in Dove Cottage, Grasmere, with his sister, Dorothy. After he wrote it he often thought about altering it, but decided to leave it as it was originally written. It was published as part of Poems, in Two Volumes in 1807.

The day after he wrote "My Heart Leaps Up" Wordsworth began to write his more ambitious  "Ode: Intimations of Immortality". The last three lines from "My Heart Leaps Up" are used as an epigraph to "Intimations of Immortality". Some scholars have noted that "My Heart Leaps Up" indicates Wordsworth's state of mind while writing the larger poem and provides clues to its interpretation.

Critical analysis
Some commentators have speculated that Wordsworth felt such joy because the rainbow indicates the constancy of his connection to nature throughout his life. Others have said that it celebrates "the continuity in Wordsworth's consciousness of self", Because the rainbow is part of a circle, Fred Blick has been able to demonstrate that the word ‘piety’ at the end of the last line makes an intentional, geometrical pun (signaled by the phrase ‘bound each to each’), symbolizing continuity and infinity. The pun blends ‘a state of infinite pi / π’ with the normal meaning of ‘reverence’. Wordsworth loved geometry and used the same, geometrical pun on ‘piety’ twice elsewhere. Many commentators also draw parallels to the rainbow of Noah and the covenant that it symbolized. Wordsworth's use of the phrase "bound each to each" in the poem also implies the presence of a covenant. Some commentators have drawn further parallels with the story of Noah. Harold Bloom has suggested that Wordsworth casts the rainbow as a symbol of the survival of his poetic gift, just as the rainbow symbolized to Noah the survival of mankind. Bloom suggests that Wordsworth's poetic gift relied on his ability to recall the memories of his joy as a child.

William Blake disliked Wordsworth's use of the phrase "natural piety". Blake believed that man was naturally impious and therefore Wordsworth's phrase contradicted itself.

In popular culture
"The child is the father of the man" is the title of a chapter in Machado de Assis's 1881 novel The Posthumous Memoirs of Brás Cubas.

The Beach Boys' songs "Surf's Up" (1971) and "Child Is Father of the Man" (2011) quote the poem.

Blood, Sweat & Tears named their 1968 studio album Child Is Father to the Man.

See also

 "Anecdote for Fathers"

References

Bibliography

External links
 

1807 poems
Poetry by William Wordsworth